The Hooked on Classics series is a collection of record albums first introduced in 1981, toward the end of the disco era's peak in popularity.  The series was disliked by many classical music purists, not least because of the background beat produced by a LinnDrum drum machine, but it had the positive effect of reviving interest in classical music among a new generation. Several volumes in the series were issued. However, interest and sales waned after the initial album. RCA Records issued the series on its Victor label, rather than the Red Seal label, in order to appeal to the wider pop-oriented audience.

History
Louis Clark, former arranger for Electric Light Orchestra, conducted the Royal Philharmonic Orchestra playing a collection of very recognizable extracts from classical music pieces played over a continuous beat (sometimes an overtly disco fast beat, sometimes a slower and more subtle rhythm) that linked the segments together. This is called the "symphonic rock" or "orchestrated rock" genre, like the London Symphony Orchestra did in its Classic Rock series, but with fewer electronic effects.

The first three albums in the series were a significant commercial success. Hooked on Classics peaked at number 4 on the U.S. Billboard albums chart, remaining on the chart for 68 weeks. It was certified platinum. Hooked on Classics 2: Can't Stop the Classics peaked at number 33, staying for 41 weeks.  It was certified gold. Hooked on Classics 3: Journey Through the Classics reached number 89, and was on the charts for 14 weeks.

The first cut of the initial album was a very successful single, reaching number 2 on the UK Singles Chart and Number 10 on the Billboard Hot 100 in late-1981/early-1982. At least two more Hooked on Classics albums were produced by Louis Clark in 1982 and 1983, as well as some other Hooked On... albums on subjects such as swing music. The series was still running as late as 1988, when Hooked on House placed classical music extracts against a synthesized bassline and house-music-style drum pattern. In 1989, the orchestra released The Classics in Rhythm, dropping the Hooked On... name, but recognizably continuing the same style of medley.

Contemporary efforts to combine classical music with contemporary arrangements included efforts by composers such as Walter Murphy, Eumir Deodato and Waldo de los Ríos.

In 2011, Hooked on Classics was brought back 'live' to the stage at the Bournemouth International Centre by ex-Hooked player Andy Smith to celebrate 30 years of this album series. Louis Clark conducted the English Pops Orchestra, featuring many of the players who recorded on the original albums.

Album listing 
 Hooked on Classics (1981)
 Hooked on Classics 2: Can't Stop the Classics (1982)
 Hooked on Swing (1982)
 Hooked on Classics 3: Journey Through the Classics (1983)
 Hooked on Swing 2 (1983)
 Hooked on Instrumentals (1983)
 Hooked on Rock Classics (1983)
 Hooked on Number Ones: 100 Non Stop Hits (1984)
 Hooked on Themes (1986)
 Hooked on Dixie (1988)
 Hooked on Rhythm and Classics (1989)
 Hooked on Dancin’ (1989)
 Hooked on Polkas (1989)
 Hooked on Country (1990)
 Hooked on Movies (1997)
 Hooked on Classics 2000 (2001)

Compilation Albums
 The Hooked on Classics Collection (1983)

References

Royal Philharmonic Orchestra albums
RCA Records albums
K-tel albums
Album series
 
Music medleys